Greta Celeste Gerwig (born August 4, 1983) is an American actress, screenwriter, and director, known for acting in and making dialogue-driven independent films. She first garnered attention after working on and appearing in several mumblecore movies. Between 2006 and 2009, she appeared in a number of films by Joe Swanberg, some of which she co-wrote or co-directed, including Hannah Takes the Stairs (2007) and Nights and Weekends (2008).

Since the early 2010s, Gerwig has collaborated with her partner Noah Baumbach on several films, including Greenberg (2010), Frances Ha (2012), for which she received a Golden Globe Award nomination, Mistress America (2015) and White Noise (2022). She also appeared in Whit Stillman's  Damsels in Distress (2011), Woody Allen's To Rome with Love (2012), Rebecca Miller's Maggie's Plan (2015), Pablo Larraín's Jackie (2016), Mike Mills' 20th Century Women (2016), and Wes Anderson's Isle of Dogs (2018).

Gerwig has had two solo directorial ventures, the coming-of-age films Lady Bird (2017) and Little Women (2019), both of which earned nominations for the Academy Award for Best Picture. For the former, she received Academy Award nominations for Best Director and Best Original Screenplay, and for the latter, she was nominated for Best Adapted Screenplay.

Gerwig was included in the annual Time 100 list of the most influential people in the world in 2018.

Early life
Gerwig was born in Sacramento, California, and grew up in the River Park neighborhood. She is the daughter of Christine (née Sauer), an OB-GYN nurse, and Gordon Gerwig, who worked for a credit union on small business loans. She is close to her parents and they make an appearance in Frances Ha as her character's parents. She has an older brother, a landscape architect, and a sister, a manager at the Equal Employment Opportunity Commission. Gerwig has German, Irish, and English ancestry.

Gerwig was raised a Unitarian Universalist. She attended St. Francis High School, an all-girls Catholic school in Sacramento, and graduated in 2002. She has described herself as having been "an intense child." Gerwig showed an early interest in dance and later took up competitive fencing, but had to quit in part due to the high costs. She had intended to complete a degree in musical theatre in New York, but ended up graduating from Barnard College with a degree in English and philosophy. Outside class, she performed in the Columbia University Varsity Show with her dorm-mate Kate McKinnon, with whom she later made the live-action Barbie movie.

Career

2006–2009: Early career
Gerwig originally intended to become a playwright, but she turned to acting when she was not admitted to playwriting MFA programs. In 2006, while still studying at Barnard, she was cast in a minor role in Joe Swanberg's LOL, and appeared in Baghead by Jay and Mark Duplass. She began a partnership with Swanberg, which resulted in the duo's co-writing Hannah Takes the Stairs (2007), and sharing both writing and directing duties on Nights and Weekends (2008). Through these films, she became known as a key figure in the rising mumblecore film movement, often referred to as an "it girl". Although she had an association with a number of other mumblecore filmmakers and appeared in several films, mainstream success remained elusive.

Of this period in her life, Gerwig has said, "I was really depressed. I was 25 [in 2008] and thinking, 'This is supposed to be the best time and I'm miserable' but it felt like acting was happening for me, and I went back to acting classes."

2010–2016: Mainstream success

In 2010, Gerwig starred in Noah Baumbach's Greenberg with Ben Stiller, Rhys Ifans, and Jennifer Jason Leigh. In an appraisal of her work in this and other films, The New York Times critic A. O. Scott described Gerwig as an "ambassador of a cinematic style that often seems opposed to the very idea of style." "She seems to be embarked on a project," Scott wrote, "however piecemeal and modestly scaled, of redefining just what it is we talk about when we talk about acting." In 2010, Gerwig made her first talk show appearance on Jimmy Kimmel Live! From 2011 to 2015, she voiced one of the main characters in the Adult Swim animated series China, IL. In 2011, she was cast as a lead in the HBO pilot The Corrections, which however was not picked up to series. In 2012, Gerwig appeared in Woody Allen's film To Rome with Love in the vignette John's Story, acting alongside Jesse Eisenberg and Alec Baldwin.

Gerwig and Baumbach co-wrote his next film, Frances Ha, which was released in May 2013 after having toured the festival circuit since September 2012. Gerwig played the title role, and received a nomination for the Golden Globe Award for Best Actress – Motion Picture Comedy or Musical for her performance. Her third collaboration with Baumbach, Mistress America, was released in August 2015 to generally positive reviews. It holds score of 75 out of 100 at Metacritic and has an 82% approval rating at Rotten Tomatoes.

In May 2014, Gerwig made her stage debut as Becky in Penelope Skinner's The Village Bike at the Lucille Lortel Theatre in New York. The show ran until the end of June. She was nominated for the Outer Critics Circle Award for Best Actress for her performance. She was cast in the lead role in a spin-off of How I Met Your Mother titled How I Met Your Dad in 2014, but it was not picked up to series.

Gerwig's next starring role was in Rebecca Miller's Maggie's Plan, which premiered as an official selection of the 2015 Toronto International Film Festival, opening to positive reviews. The film was also screened at the 2016 Sundance Film Festival and the 66th Berlin International Film Festival. That same year, Gerwig starred in Pablo Larraín's Jackie, and Mike Mills' 20th Century Women, earning acclaim for both performances, particularly her work in the latter, for which she earned a nomination for the Critics' Choice Movie Award for Best Supporting Actress.

In 2016, she guest-starred in two episodes of the comedy series The Mindy Project.

2017–present: Directorial focus 
In 2017, Gerwig made her solo directorial debut (after having co-directed Nights and Weekends) with the coming-of-age comedy-drama film Lady Bird, which she also wrote. The film's cast includes Saoirse Ronan, Laurie Metcalf, Tracy Letts, Lucas Hedges, Timothée Chalamet, Beanie Feldstein, Stephen McKinley Henderson, and Lois Smith. Lady Bird premiered at the Telluride Film Festival and was theatrically released in November 2017. The film grossed over $78 million against its $10 million budget worldwide.

Upon its release, Lady Bird received widespread critical acclaim, with reviewers particularly lauding Gerwig's screenplay and direction. The film was chosen by the National Board of Review, the American Film Institute, and Time magazine as one of the top ten films of 2017. According to the review-aggregation website Rotten Tomatoes, it was given 196 positive reviews in a row, making it the record-holder for the most "fresh" reviews, until the first "rotten" one arrived in December 2017. It currently has a 99% rating on the aforementioned website.

At the 75th Golden Globe Awards, Lady Bird won Best Motion Picture – Musical or Comedy and Best Actress – Musical or Comedy for Saoirse Ronan, and also received nominations for Best Supporting Actress for Laurie Metcalf and Best Screenplay for Gerwig. At the 90th Academy Awards, it was nominated for Best Picture, Best Director and Best Original Screenplay for Gerwig, Best Actress for Ronan, and Best Supporting Actress for Metcalf. With the nominations announced, Gerwig became the fifth woman in Oscar history to be nominated for Best Director. When she found out about the nominations, Gerwig said she was "in various states of laughing and crying and yelling with joy."

In 2018, following the success of Lady Bird, Gerwig was part of the voice cast of Wes Anderson's stop-motion animated film Isle of Dogs, which premiered at the 68th Berlin International Film Festival to critical acclaim, and was nominated for the Academy Award for Best Animated Feature.

In June 2018, it was announced that Gerwig would direct a new film adaptation of Louisa May Alcott's novel Little Women, whose script she had been previously hired to write. With an ensemble cast featuring Saoirse Ronan, Emma Watson, Florence Pugh, Eliza Scanlen, Laura Dern, Timothée Chalamet, and Meryl Streep, Little Women was released in December 2019 to widespread critical acclaim. At the 92nd Academy Awards, it received six nominations, including Best Picture, Best Actress for Ronan, Best Supporting Actress for Pugh, Best Adapted Screenplay for Gerwig, Best Original Score, and a win for Best Costume Design. The film was frequently mentioned as part of an Oscars controversy after no woman (including Gerwig) was nominated for Best Director, a snub that was publicly noted by Hillary Clinton and Saturday Night Live, amongst others. Gerwig's name was one of those featured on the outfit that actress Natalie Portman wore to the ceremony, which featured the surnames of snubbed female directors from that year's ceremony.

Gerwig co-starred with Adam Driver in Baumbach's 2022 film White Noise, adapted from the novel of same name by Don DeLillo for Netflix. The movie opened both the 79th Venice International Film Festival and the 60th New York Film Festival and was made available on the streaming platform in late 2022. Gerwig also co-wrote with her partner and is directing Warner Bros.'s live-action Barbie film, starring Margot Robbie in the title role, which finished filming in 2022 and is expected to open theatrically on July 21, 2023. The movie also stars Ryan Gosling (as the doll Ken), Will Ferrell, America Ferrera, Kate McKinnon, Issa Rae, Simu Liu, Ncuti Gatwa, Emma Mackey and Michael Cera. In November 2021, it was reported that Gerwig had done work on the screenplay for Disney's upcoming live-action film Snow White.

Directorial style
Gerwig's films tend to be based on her own experiences.  In a behind-the-scenes video on the set of Lady Bird she said, "I tend to start with things from my own life, then pretty quickly they spin out into their own orbit." Gerwig presses her actors to incorporate their personalities into their performances as well, and says of her writing and directing, "it's all about actors." In addition, she allows little line improvisation and the script is followed fairly closely.

Influences
In an interview with Maclean's, Gerwig cited Woody Allen as a major influence in her work stating, "His influence is hard to measure because it runs so deep". Her other influences include Howard Hawks, Ernst Lubitsch, Carole Lombard, Joan Didion, Patti Smith, Chantal Akerman, Claire Denis, Mia Hansen-Løve, John Huston, Mike Leigh and Agnès Varda.

Personal life
She lives in Brooklyn with American filmmaker Noah Baumbach, her partner since late 2011. In March 2019, it was announced Gerwig had given birth to their first child. In December 2022, Gerwig announced that she was expecting their second child.

Filmography

Film 

Acting roles

Television

Theatre

Awards and nominations

In 2011, Gerwig won an award from the Athena Film Festival for her artistry as one of Hollywood's definitive screen actresses of her generation. In 2014, she was selected as a member of the jury for the 64th Berlin International Film Festival. In 2018, her nomination for Best Director at the 90th Academy Awards for Lady Bird made her the first woman in eight years (and one of only five women in Oscar history) to have been nominated in that category. Gerwig's work on Lady Bird was nominated for sixteen awards in notable circuits, winning six of those awards.

Directed Academy Award performances

Gerwig has directed multiple Oscar nominated performances.

See also
 List of female film and television directors
List of directors associated with art film

References

External links

 

1983 births
Living people
21st-century American actresses
Actresses from Sacramento, California
American film actresses
American people of English descent
American people of German descent
American people of Irish descent
American Unitarian Universalists
American women film directors
American women screenwriters
Barnard College alumni
Film directors from California
Writers from Sacramento, California
Independent Spirit Award winners
Screenwriters from California